Too (sometimes stylized as too) is the fourth studio album by Fantastic Plastic Machine. It was released on February 26, 2003. It peaked at number 35 on the Oricon Albums Chart. It includes contributions from Incognito, Verbal, Maki Takamiya, Ryohei Yamamoto, Coralie Clément, and Ward E. Sexton.

Track listing

Charts

References

External links
 

2003 albums
Fantastic Plastic Machine (musician) albums
Avex Group albums